"Thanks for Christmas" is a song by the English band XTC, credited as "the Three Wise Men" and written by Andy Partridge It was released by Virgin Records in late 1983 as a holiday single backed with "Countdown to Christmas Party Time". The song made its first album appearance on the 1990 compilation album Rag and Bone Buffet: Rare Cuts and Leftovers.

Overview
"Thanks for Christmas" was a novelty song recorded to test Crescent Studios owner David Lord's potential as a producer for XTC. It was recorded in late 1983, shortly before sessions commenced for the album The Big Express (1984). Originally, the group wanted to be credited as "the Virgin Marys" for the single, but the record label objected. According to Partridge, "I like the idea of anonymous music, and I thought I'd put together a song and then find an act to do it." It is the only instance in the band's catalog where Partridge and Moulding share lead vocals.

Another song, "Countdown to Christmas Party Time", was recorded as the single's B-side. Partridge described the song as "all-out stupid funky" and "ersatz Michael Jackson or something". Erica Wexler contributed backing vocals and David Lord is credited as "The Good Lord" on the record sleeve.

Personnel
XTC
 Andy Partridge
 Colin Moulding
 Dave Gregory

References

External link
 "Thanks for Christmas" on Chalkhills

1983 songs
Songs written by Andy Partridge
British Christmas songs
XTC songs